"O, O, O..." is a song by the Yugoslav new wave band Šarlo Akrobata, from the album Bistriji ili tuplji čovek biva kad..., released in 1981.

Cover versions 
 Električni Orgazam frontman Srđan Gojković "Gile" covered the song on the Jako dobar tattoo Milan Mladenović tribute album in 2002.
 Serbian punk rock Novembar covered the song on the Kao da je bilo nekad... Posvećeno Milanu Mladenoviću Milan Mladenović tribute in 2003. The song also appeared on their 2008 studio album Radulizam.

External links and references 

 EX YU ROCK enciklopedija 1960-2006, Janjatović Petar; 

1981 songs